Rooky is a Rummy-like card game based on the usage of a Rook deck rather than a standard 52 playing card deck. The rules, while closely resembling a simple game of Rummy, integrates some of Rook's popular elements, such as trick-taking and team-play. The game is usually suggested for 2 - 5 players, though larger groups and teams are encouraged. There are also special rules for dealing with 6 or more players.

The name Rooky is a portmanteau of Rook and Rummy.

Game Basics
In Rooky, the objective of the game is to be the player (or team) with the highest-scoring melds. This usually involves strict teamwork and capturing (or stealing) opponent melds. A preset score goal is usually established before game play, allowing players to go through several hands before this goal is met and the game ends.

After dealing and bidding has finished, the player with the highest bid executes a turn, drawing a card from the deck (or graveyard, when applicable) and shuffling through possible plays. Like Rummy, the player is not necessarily obligated to play a meld when one is available—she or he may hold onto it for later. After making this decision, a card from the hand is discarded into the graveyard, (see below) and the player's turn ends.

Once a player has discarded their last card, they are considered to be out. Out status means that the player is out of the current hand, and can no longer contribute until the other player(s) have finished. Following the first player going out, all other players must also go out except for the last, who is left with a hand of penalty cards. Going out is not to be confused with 'floating,' however—players who run out of cards due to playing melds are considered to be floating, and will continue to draw until a final discard is made, bringing them into the out status.

Once all other players have gone out, the scores are tallied, with the remaining player suffering a penalty according to the cards left in their hand at the time. (The stand-alone value of the remainder cards are subtracted from the penalized player's total score.) When playing in teams, scores are always tallied in that particular group, and not attributed to the individual players.

Dealing
In a standard 2 - 5 person game, 7 cards are dealt (clock- or counter-clockwise) to all players. When playing with more than 5 persons, only 5 cards are dealt. The order of who deals usually depends on who lost the previous hand, though there are no strict rules as to how this order may be determined, and can depend entirely on preference.

Bidding
After the deal, each player takes a glance at their hands and makes a rough prediction (or bluff) of how much they'll be able to score. This value can range from 5 - 120, always being a multiple of 5. (Larger bid values may be called in team-play, as higher scores are easier to obtain.) After the initial bids are announced, the players may feel free to change their bids until an agreement is reached and each player has settled on a solid value. Then, the player / team with the highest bid takes the right of going first, with the second-highest (and next lowest, etc.) proceeding in turn order. Once the hand is finished, the winner is awarded a score bonus equal to their bid, while the losers suffer a penalty equal to their own bids.

Teams
Although teams cooperate in forming melds, teammates may not look at one another's hand, nor may they make hints at which cards are in their possession.

Making Plays
When a meld is played, (of matching or sequential card combinations of two or more) it is placed face-up on the table in front of the player (or team) who made it. The types of available plays are listed below in the Plays & Sequences section. In team-play, groups have the option of merging melds in order to form some of the larger sequences, unlocking otherwise difficult plays.

When making or capturing a play, the sequence doesn't necessarily have to be followed right to left. Players may, for example, meld a 12 and 13 (of the same suit) without having everything that comes beforehand. The previous cards may then be added to the meld as they become available.

Capturing
Capturing is the process of stealing melds from opponent players. This is achieved when the player's hand can allow for them to add to an opponent's weak play with two or more cards. (see below) This is similar to playing from opponent melds in Rummy, though the player is actually rewarded their opponent's meld rather than piggybacking it for a minor score extension. For example:

Player 1 has made the following weak play...
Red-1 + Red-2 + Red-3 = 15 points

Player 2, having Red-4 and Red-5 in their deck, captures Player 1's meld, turning it into a Red-1 through Red-5 weak play for 25 points.

Consequently, players may capture back a play while it is still weak, and at an indefinite number of times. However, once a meld has become locked in a strong state, it becomes impossible to capture it, unless the wild Rook card is used to extend the play. (Only when sequentially logical.) For example:

Player 1 turns their weak play of Red-4 + Green-4 + Black-4 into a strong play by adding Yellow-4. Normally, this meld cannot be captured, as there are no more 4's in the deck. However, since the Rook is wild, it may be substituted as another 4, allowing the meld to be taken.

The Graveyard
When a player is ready to discard and end the turn, a card is placed face-down into the graveyard, which is generally just a second drawing deck. This gives players the option of taking their chances with the graveyard, rather than the standard deck only. Players may easily exploit this to their benefit, purposely discarding certain cards for the advantage / disadvantage of opponents and teammates.

Plays & Sequences
Weak Play ... (variable score)
This is the most common type of play, consisting of a meld of either a numbered sequence of one suit, or two or more matching numbers of any suit. Usually, every play starts off as weak, and progressively grows into a stronger meld as the hand progresses. During this time, there is a very large window of opportunity for capturing. The score of weak plays are determined solely by the stand-alone value of each card in the meld added together.

Strong Play ... 50 points (70 w/ Rook bonus)
When 4 cards of the same number are played, this is considered a strong play. As mentioned above, a strong play cannot be captured unless the wild Rook is used to substitute a fifth number in the sequence.

Spread (weak) ... 55 points (75 w/ Rook bonus)
This is a simple meld numbered 1 - 5 of one suit.

Straight (weak) ... 75 points (95 w/ Rook bonus)
This meld consists of a suit of cards numbered 1 - 10.

Full Suit (strong) ... 110 points
Full suits consist of 1 entire color suit, numbered 1 through 14. Though difficult to attain, this meld offers a high score bonus.

Master Suit (strong) ... 140 points
A master suit is a full suit with the Rook card tagged on the end of the meld. A master suit is the highest possible meld in the game.

Card Values

†Optionally, some players may consider all 1's (and sometimes, 2's, 3's and 4's) to be null of value. This tends to make them less common in plays, allowing a larger window for captures.

See also
Rook (card game)
Rummy

Rummy
Dedicated deck card games